Pueblo Catholic High School  was a Catholic high school in Pueblo, Colorado, under the Roman Catholic Diocese of Pueblo.

The school closed in 1971.

The first Catholic school in Pueblo opened on Michigan Street in 1875 as St. Patrick High School, it was renamed in 1935 to Pueblo Catholic High. In 1950 A new Pueblo Catholic High School building was completed on Lake Avenue.

References

1971 disestablishments in Colorado
Educational institutions disestablished in 1971